James Cooper Doud (May 17, 1902 – August 30, 1984), also known as Jimmy, was a popular businessman and major real estate developer in Carmel-by-the-Sea, California. He established the Doud Building in 1932, built by master builder Michael J. Murphy. He also owned The Doud Arcade, a two-story commercial building built in 1961 that connects with The Doud Craft Studios.

Early life 

Doud was born on May 17, 1902, in Monterey, California, in a house built by his pioneering grandfather, Francis Doud (1820-1910), who arrived in Monterey in 1845, stationed with the Army at the Presidio and served as sergeant-at-arms for the California Constitution Convention held at Colton Hall in 1849. His father was Thomas Doud (1854-1929) and mother was Margaret Boland (1865-1950). In August 1920, Doud applied for a U.S. application for a Seaman's protection  Certificate. This allowed him to depart from the port of San Francisco.

In 1922, when Doud was 20 years old, he acted in the play The Queen's Enemies, by Lord Dunsany, designed and directed by John Northern Hilliard at the Carmel Arts and Crafts Club Theater. Doud played the character Tharrabas. He was engaged to Leslie Thorne in Chicago in 1926 but the engagement was called off. Doud attended Stanford University in 1927, where he played on the college football team.

On September 8, 1927, Carmel's Abalone League became a corporation and was chartered under the laws of the State of California. The founders of the league and first board of directors were Byington Ford, James Doud, Talbert Josselyn, Frank Sheridan, and Ernest Schweninger. The articles of incorporation stated that the "Abalone League is a cooperative association organized for the purpose of fostering athletics, particularly baseball, and to provide for the physical benefit of Carmel's citizenry."

Doud married Frances Lillian Allen (1901-1993) on July 28, 1928, in Reno, Nevada. They had a son, Dr. Toland "Toley" Sharon Doud (1925-2007) of Carmel Valley, and a daughter Stephanie Margaret (Peggy) Doud (1928-2002) of Pebble Beach; and one half sister, Louise Glassell-Warren (1922-2011) of New Jersey. Doud also had a son outside of marriage. James and Frances were married for 56 years.

Career

After college, Doud worked in real estate for the Del Monte Prosperities Company out of the Hotel Del Monte. In the late 1920s, he worked for William Wrigley, the chewing gum industrialist, and was sales manager for the Arizona Biltmore resort project, in Phoenix, Arizona that included a golf course and homes. He moved to Santa Barbara, California to operate a men's clothing store. After the death of his father in 1929, he returned to Monterey to run the family ranches near King City, California and the old Soberanes Ranch (now Garrapata State Park), below Carmel Highlands, California, where he took an active part in roundup, branding, and in cattle drives.

Doud was active in the development and sale of subdivisions in and near Carmel, which included Paradise Park, a  site east of Carpenter Street and north of Ocean Avenue. In February 1940, Paradise Park was acquired by Doud and attorney William L. Hudson. Doud and Hudson filed a subdivision map in April 1940. Throughout the 1940s, they promoted Paradise Park and sold lots, with streets named for early pioneers, Honoré Escolle, George Sterling, and Perry Newberry.

Doud joined Corum Jackson as a partner in the Carmel Realty Company. He also was invovled in the subdivision and marketing of the Mission Fields Tract, the Walker Tract, and Rancho Rio Vista.

Buildings

Doud was a major real estate developer in downtown Carmel. In 1932, Doud established the Doud Building, built by master builder Michael J. Murphy as a mixed-use retail shop and residence, located on the SW corner of Ocean Avenue and Mission Street. The cost of the building was $6,300.

Doud built The Doud Arcade, a two-story commercial building built in 1961 in downtown Carmel. Plans were submitted to the Carmel planning commissioners by architect Robert Jones in September 1960. The arcade is located on Ocean Avenue SW of San Carolos Street. The Ocean Avenue entrance takes you through a passageway with shops on both sides and restaurants on the ground floor and offices on the second floor. The arcade connects with The Doud Craft Studios, home for local craftsmen with studios above and shops below. Doud retired in 1969.

Death

Doud died on August 30, 1984, in Honolulu, Hawaii, at the age of 82. He was buried in the Monterey City Cemetery in Monterey, California. Funeral services took place on September 8, 1984, at the Santa Rosa Lia Chapel at the San Carlos Cemetery. He is survived by his wife, son, and two daughters.

See also
 Timeline of Carmel-by-the-Sea, California

References

External links
 James Cooper Doud Historical Marker

 

1902 births
1984 deaths
People from California
People from Carmel-by-the-Sea, California